Pfütsero  is a town located in the Phek District of the Indian state of Nagaland. It is the highest-altitude town and the coldest inhabited place in Nagaland with temperatures occasionally dropping below 0 °C during winter nights. It is headed by an ADC and is inhabited mostly by Khezhas and Chokris. It is a commercially important town as it is located in the middle of Phek District.

Demographics
, Pfütsero had a population of 10,371.

Religion
The inhabitants of Pfütsero are predominantly Baptist, however there are also Roman Catholic, Pentecost, and Revivalist.

Tourism
Pfütsero  is rapidly growing to be a tourist destination. The best time to visit is from mid October (harvesting time) to April. The most important festival of the Khezhas is Tsükhenye festival. It is celebrated in April/May. One can just go down to Pfütseromi Village which is only about 1.5 km from Pfütsero to witness Tsükhenye from 24–27 April as the village celebrates it during this time.

Education
There are several educational institutes in Pfütsero, including:

Colleges
 Pfütsero Government College

Schools
 Nazareth School
 Baptist School
 Union Christian School
 Tewelhi Medo Tyrannus Higher Secondary School
 Chakhesang Mission Higher Secondary School
 Government Higher Secondary School
 King David School
 Woodland School

Other Institutions
 Baptist Theological College
 District Institute of Educational Training (DIET)
 Allied Education Academic of Information Technology. Universal Program for computer Education.

Transportation
National Highway 29 passes through Pfütsero.

References

External links

 
 About Pfütsero

Phek district
Hill stations in Nagaland